Lussas-et-Nontronneau is a commune in the Dordogne department in Nouvelle-Aquitaine in southwestern France. In 1827, the former communes of Lussas and Nontronneau merged into Lussas-et-Nontronneau.

Population

See also
Communes of the Dordogne department
Château de Beauvais (Lussas-et-Nontronneau)

References

1827 establishments in France
Communes of Dordogne